Levant Frederick Thompson (December 26, 1827 – May 27, 1894) was an American politician in the state of Washington. He served in the Washington State Senate from 1889 to 1893 (1889–91 for district 18, 1891–93 for district 19).

References

Republican Party Washington (state) state senators
1827 births
1894 deaths
19th-century American politicians